The following lists events that happened during 2014 in Niger.

Incumbents
President: Mahamadou Issoufou 
Prime Minister: Brigi Rafini

Events

March
 March 6 - Niger deports Saadi al-Gaddafi, son of Muammar al-Gaddafi, to Libya.

May
 May 17 - Nigeria, Niger, Cameroon, Benin, and Chad join together to combat Boko Haram.

October
 October 27 - An outbreak of cholera kills 51.

November
 November 24 - Boko Haram captures the northeastern Nigerian town of Damasak, killing 50 and forcing more than 3,000 to flee across the border into Niger.

References

 
Years of the 21st century in Niger
Niger
Niger
2010s in Niger